Bryan Witzmann (born June 16, 1990) is an American football offensive guard who is a free agent. He played college football at South Dakota State University. He was a contestant on The Bachelorette.

Professional career

Houston Texans
Witzmann signed with the Houston Texans as an undrafted free agent on May 16, 2014. He was placed on injured reserve on August 2, 2014.

On September 1, 2015, Witzmann was waived by the Texans.

New Orleans Saints
On September 16, 2015, Witzmann was signed to the New Orleans Saints' practice squad. He was released by the Saints on November 11, 2015 but was re-signed on December 24. He signed a futures contract with the Saints on January 5, 2016. He was waived on May 17, 2016.

Dallas Cowboys
On June 8, 2016, Witzmann signed with the Dallas Cowboys. He was released by the Cowboys on September 3, 2016.

Kansas City Chiefs
Witzmann was claimed off waivers by the Kansas City Chiefs on September 4, 2016. On July 27, 2017, he signed a one-year contract extension with the Chiefs through 2018.

In 2017, Witzmann played in all 16 games, starting 13 at left guard for the Chiefs.

On September 3, 2018, Witzmann was released by the Chiefs after losing the starting left guard job to Cameron Erving.

Minnesota Vikings
On September 10, 2018, Witzmann was signed by the Minnesota Vikings. He was released on October 5, 2018.

Chicago Bears
On October 8, 2018, Witzmann was signed by the Chicago Bears. In November, with right guard Kyle Long on injured reserve, Witzmann began splitting time at the spot with Eric Kush. He was named the starting right guard in Week 10, and started 7 games there until Long returned from injury in Week 17.

Cleveland Browns

On March 22, 2019, Witzmann signed with the Cleveland Browns. The Browns released Witzmann on August 31, 2019.

Miami Dolphins
On September 14, 2019, Witzmann was signed by the Miami Dolphins, but was released five days later.

Carolina Panthers
On September 23, 2019, Witzmann was signed by the Carolina Panthers. On November 12, 2019, Witzmann was waived by the Panthers.

Kansas City Chiefs (second stint)
On October 28, 2020, Witzmann was signed to the Kansas City Chiefs practice squad. He was elevated to the active roster on November 7 and 21 for the team's weeks 9 and 11 games against the Carolina Panthers and Las Vegas Raiders, and reverted to the practice squad after each game. On February 9, 2021, Witzmann re-signed with the Chiefs. He was released on May 10, 2021. He re-signed with the team on August 8, 2021. He was released on August 23.

Atlanta Falcons
On September 15, 2021, Witzmann was signed to the Atlanta Falcons practice squad. He was released on September 21, 2021.

References

External links
Atlanta Falcons bio
South Dakota State Jackrabbits bio

1990 births
Living people
American football offensive tackles
Atlanta Falcons players
Carolina Panthers players
Chicago Bears players
Cleveland Browns players
Dallas Cowboys players
Houston Texans players
Kansas City Chiefs players
Miami Dolphins players
Minnesota Vikings players
New Orleans Saints players
People from Danville, Illinois
People from St. Croix County, Wisconsin
Players of American football from Illinois
South Dakota State Jackrabbits football players
Sportspeople from the Minneapolis–Saint Paul metropolitan area
Bachelor Nation contestants